Nocardiopsis nikkonensis  is a bacterium from the genus of Nocardiopsis which has been isolated from compost soil in Nikko in Japan.

References

External links
Type strain of Nocardiopsis nikkonensis at BacDive -  the Bacterial Diversity Metadatabase	

Actinomycetales
Bacteria described in 2010